Deh-e Bala (also Romanized as Deh-e Bālā) is a village in Sar Asiab-e Farsangi Rural District, in the Central District of Kerman County, Kerman Province, Iran. At the 2006 census, its population was 232, in 71 families.

References 

Populated places in Kerman County